Tas kebab (also tas kebap or tas kebabı) is a Turkish meat stew. It is also used in the Balkans and Iran, with a different cooking method. It may be made with veal or mutton.

See also
 List of stews

References

External links

Turkish cuisine
Iranian cuisine
Turkish stews
Iranian stews